St Nicholas’ Church, West Looe is a Church of England parish church in Looe, Cornwall.

History
The church, dedicated to St Nicholas, Bishop of Myra was built either in the 13th or 14th century by the D’Aubigny family, who then held the Manors of Looe. It was endowed on 11 July 1336 by parishioners of Talland, and by Sir John Dawnay. The endowment was confirmed by Bishop John Grandisson of Exeter.

During the time of the Commonwealth of England, the Chapel became the Guildhall for West Looe, but was restored for public worship on the accession of King Charles II. This was short-lived, and later it reverted to be the Guildhall and prison until 1852. It was restored for public worship through the efforts of the vicar, Mr. Seymour and John Francis Buller of Morval, with work done by local country tradesmen under the supervision of Captain C. Cocks, when an aisle was added and it re-opened for public worship on All Saints’ Day, 1852. The chancel was lengthened, using timber from the St Josef, a ship captured by Admiral Nelson at the Battle of Cape St Vincent (1797).

Parish status
The church is in a joint parish with 
St Wenna’s Church, Morval
St Martin’s Church, St Martin-by-Looe

References

West Looe
West Looe
Looe